The 2006 Orange Bowl, a 2005–06 BCS game, was played on January 3, 2006. This 72nd edition to the Orange Bowl featured the Penn State Nittany Lions and the Florida State Seminoles.

This game was known for being the eighth, and ultimately final meeting, between the two coaches, Joe Paterno of Penn State and Bobby Bowden of Florida State, the two winningest D1 FBS coaches in history.

Overtime summary
The three-overtime game took over four hours. It is regarded as one of the more entertaining Orange Bowls due to the high excitement level and some key missed kicks.

Florida State started on offense to begin the first overtime. Kicker Gary Cismesia's 44-yard attempt went wide right.  Penn State conservatively rushed three times and attempted a 38-yard field goal on their first overtime drive.  However, kicker Kevin Kelly's try pushed wide left.

In the second overtime, both team scored on 1-yard touchdown runs tying the game at 23–23.

In the third overtime, Florida State's kicking woes continued. Cismesia's 38-yard attempt hit the right upright.  On 2nd and 9 on the 12-yard line, Kelly hit a 29-yard field goal to give Joe Paterno and the Nittany Lions the win over Bobby Bowden and the Seminoles.

Scoring summary

Aftermath

Florida State had a rough season for their standards having lost four games going into their ACC Championship game against Virginia Tech. They were solid underdogs (2 TD) and still found a way to upset the Hokies in the first ever ACC title game.

Penn State was one play away from an undefeated season albeit both USC and Texas likely would have still played for the BCS title that season. The Nittany Lions finished third in the final AP Poll, a ranking they have not reached since (entering 2020).

References

External links
 2006 Orange Bowl page on ESPN

Orange Bowl
Orange Bowl
Florida State Seminoles football bowl games
Penn State Nittany Lions football bowl games
January 2006 sports events in the United States
2006 in sports in Florida
2000s in Miami